Saskatoon City was a provincial electoral division in the Canadian province of Saskatchewan. This constituency existed from 1908 to 1967. It was the riding of Premier James T.M. Anderson.

The riding was created for the 1908 election to separate the rapidly growing city of Saskatoon from the original riding of Saskatoon, which was renamed Saskatoon County. During the 15th Saskatchewan Legislative Assembly (from 1964 to 1967), an amendment to the Representation Act divided Saskatoon City into several electoral divisions:

 Saskatoon City Park-University
 Saskatoon Mayfair
 Saskatoon Nutana Centre
 Saskatoon Nutana South
 Saskatoon Riversdale

From 1921 to 1967 Saskatoon City was one of three districts in the province that elected more than one representative to the Legislature. Thus, multiple MLAs elected from this constituency will be noted in bold type.

Election results

|-

 
|Provincial Rights
|James R. Wilson
|align="right"|717
|align="right"|47.45%
|align="right"|–
|- bgcolor="white"
!align="left" colspan=3|Total
!align="right"|1,511
!align="right"|100.00%
!align="right"|

|-

|- bgcolor="white"
!align="left" colspan=3|Total
!align="right"|Acclamation
!align="right"|

|-

 
|Conservative
|Hugh Edwin Munroe
|align="right"|1,359
|align="right"|48.21%
|align="right"|-
|- bgcolor="white"
!align="left" colspan=3|Total
!align="right"|2,819
!align="right"|100.00%
!align="right"|

|-
 
| style="width: 130px"|Conservative
|Donald Maclean
|align="right"|2,592
|align="right"|52.23%
|align="right"|+4.02

|Labour
|Alexander Melville Eddy
|align="right"|476
|align="right"|9.59%
|align="right"|–
|- bgcolor="white"
!align="left" colspan=3|Total
!align="right"|4,963
!align="right"|100.00%
!align="right"|

|-

| style="width: 130px"|Independent
|Harris Turner
|align="right"|4,672
|align="right"|26.35%
|align="right"|–

 
|Conservative
|George Arthur Cruise
|align="right"|3,293
|align="right"|18.57%
|align="right"|-

|Independent Labour
|Alexander Melville Eddy
|align="right"|1,690
|align="right"|9.53%
|align="right"|-
|- bgcolor="white"
!align="left" colspan=3|Total
!align="right"|17,732
!align="right"|100.00%
!align="right"|

|-

 
| style="width: 130px"|Conservative
|James Thomas Milton Anderson
|align="right"|5,001
|align="right"|22.58%
|align="right"|-
 
|Conservative
|George Arthur Cruise
|align="right"|4,250
|align="right"|19.18%
|align="right"|-

|- bgcolor="white"
!align="left" colspan=3|Total
!align="right"|22,155
!align="right"|100.00%
!align="right"|

|-
 
| style="width: 130px"|Conservative
|Howard McConnell
|align="right"|5,288
|align="right"|55.09%
|align="right"|-

|- bgcolor="white"
!align="left" colspan=3|Total
!align="right"|9,599
!align="right"|100.00%
!align="right"|

|-
 
| style="width: 130px"|Conservative
|Howard McConnell
|align="right"|10,141
|align="right"|31.77%
|align="right"|-
 
| style="width: 130px"|Conservative
|James Thomas Milton Anderson
|align="right"|9,668
|align="right"|30.29%
|align="right"|-

|- bgcolor="white"
!align="left" colspan=3|Total
!align="right"|31,918
!align="right"|100.00%
!align="right"|

|-
 
| style="width: 130px"|Conservative
|James Thomas Milton Anderson
|align="right"|Acclaimed
|align="right"|
 
| style="width: 130px"|Conservative
|Howard McConnell
|align="right"|Acclaimed
|align="right"|
|- bgcolor="white"
!align="left" colspan=3|Total
!align="right"|Acclamation
!align="right"|

|-

 
|Conservative
|James Thomas Milton Anderson
|align="right"|7,511
|align="right"|19.56%
|align="right"|-
 
|Conservative
|Howard McConnell
|align="right"|6,797
|align="right"|17.70%
|align="right"|-

|Farmer-Labour
|Gladys Isabel Salisbury
|align="right"|3,098
|align="right"|8.07%
|align="right"|–

|Farmer-Labour
|John Johnson Egge
|align="right"|2,797
|align="right"|7.29%
|align="right"|–

|- bgcolor="white"
!align="left" colspan=3|Total
!align="right"|38,394
!align="right"|100.00%
!align="right"|

|-

 
|Conservative
|James Thomas Milton Anderson
|align="right"|5,006
|align="right"|13.49%
|align="right"|-

|Independent Labour
|Robert Hunter
|align="right"|4,813
|align="right"|12.96%
|align="right"|-
 
|Conservative
|Stephen N. MacEachern
|align="right"|4,692
|align="right"|12.64%
|align="right"|-

|- bgcolor="white"
!align="left" colspan=3|Total
!align="right"|37,120
!align="right"|100.00%
!align="right"|

|-
 
| style="width: 130px"|CCF
|John H. Sturdy
|align="right"|9,375
|align="right"|26.16%
|align="right"|-
 
| style="width: 130px"|CCF
|Arthur T. Stone
|align="right"|7,792
|align="right"|21.75%
|align="right"|-
 
|Prog. Conservative
|Rupert D. Ramsay
|align="right"|5,368
|align="right"|14.98%
|align="right"|-

 
|Prog. Conservative
|Henry O. Wright
|align="right"|3,171
|align="right"|8.85%
|align="right"|-

|Independent
|Russell Hartney
|align="right"|200
|align="right"|0.56%
|align="right"|-

|Independent
|John Harrison Hilton
|align="right"|121
|align="right"|0.34%
|align="right"|-
|- bgcolor="white"
!align="left" colspan=3|Total
!align="right"|35,832
!align="right"|100.00%
!align="right"|

|-
 
| style="width: 130px"|CCF
|John H. Sturdy
|align="right"|14,970
|align="right"|26.66%
|align="right"|-
 
| style="width: 130px"|CCF
|Arthur T. Stone
|align="right"|14,295
|align="right"|25.46%
|align="right"|-
 
|Prog. Conservative
|Rupert D. Ramsay
|align="right"|13,376
|align="right"|23.82%
|align="right"|-

|- bgcolor="white"
!align="left" colspan=3|Total
!align="right"|56,151
!align="right"|100.00%
!align="right"|

1952 Saskatchewan general election
Approx. 35,000 voters cast votes in this election

|-
 
| style="width: 130px"|CCF
|John H. Sturdy
|align="right"|16,546
|align="right"|29.63%
|align="right"|-
 
| style="width: 130px"|CCF
|Arthur T. Stone
|align="right"|16,228
|align="right"|29.06%
|align="right"|-

 
|Prog. Conservative
|John Hnatyshyn
|align="right"|2,947
|align="right"|5.28%
|align="right"|-
 
|Prog. Conservative
|Percy H. Maguire
|align="right"|2,869
|align="right"|5.14%
|align="right"|-

|- bgcolor="white"
!align="left" colspan=3|Total
!align="right"|55,841
!align="right"|100.00%
!align="right"|

1956 Saskatchewan general election
Approx. 35,000 voters cast votes in this election

|-
 
| style="width: 130px"|CCF
|John H. Sturdy
|align="right"|15,368
|align="right"|27.11%
|align="right"|-
 
| style="width: 130px"|CCF
|Arthur T. Stone
|align="right"|15,014
|align="right"|26.49%
|align="right"|-

 
|Prog. Conservative
|Alvin Hamilton
|align="right"|3,534
|align="right"|6.23%
|align="right"|-
 
|Prog. Conservative
|Lillie F. Bowman
|align="right"|2,280
|align="right"|4.02%
|align="right"|-

|- bgcolor="white"
!align="left" colspan=3|Total
!align="right"|56,677
!align="right"|100.00%
!align="right"|

1960 Saskatchewan general election
Approx. 40,000 voters cast votes in this election

|-
 
| style="width: 130px"|CCF
|Arthur T. Stone
|align="right"|16,159
|align="right"|14.63%
|align="right"|-
 
| style="width: 130px"|CCF
|Alex M. Nicholson
|align="right"|15,877
|align="right"|14.38%
|align="right"|-
 
| style="width: 130px"|CCF
|Gladys Strum
|align="right"|15,782
|align="right"|14.29%
|align="right"|-

 
|Prog. Conservative
|Lewis Brand
|align="right"|7,042
|align="right"|6.38%
|align="right"|-
 
|Prog. Conservative
|Edward M. Hughes
|align="right"|6,972
|align="right"|6.31%
|align="right"|-
 
|Prog. Conservative
|Thomas Park
|align="right"|5,676
|align="right"|5.14%
|align="right"|-

|- bgcolor="white"
!align="left" colspan=3|Total
!align="right"|110,428
!align="right"|100.00%
!align="right"|

1964 Saskatchewan general election
Approx. 50,000 voters cast votes in this election

|-
 
| style="width: 130px"|CCF
|Alex M. Nicholson
|align="right"|16,701
|align="right"|7.83%
|align="right"|-
 
| style="width: 130px"|CCF
|Ed Brockelbank
|align="right"|16,559
|align="right"|7.76%
|align="right"|-
 
| style="width: 130px"|CCF
|Wes Robbins
|align="right"|16,126
|align="right"|7.56%
|align="right"|-

 
| style="width: 130px"|CCF
|Harry D. Link
|align="right"|16,041
|align="right"|7.52%
|align="right"|-

 
| style="width: 130px"|CCF
|Gladys Strum
|align="right"|15,741
|align="right"|7.38%
|align="right"|-

 
|Prog. Conservative
|Lewis Brand
|align="right"|11,401
|align="right"|5.34%
|align="right"|-
 
|Prog. Conservative
|W. Hugh Arscott
|align="right"|11,344
|align="right"|5.32%
|align="right"|-
 
|Prog. Conservative
|Ray Hnatyshyn
|align="right"|10,874
|align="right"|5.09%
|align="right"|-
 
|Prog. Conservative
|Henry C. Rees
|align="right"|10,543
|align="right"|4.94%
|align="right"|-
 
|Prog. Conservative
|Irving Goldenberg
|align="right"|10,240
|align="right"|4.80%
|align="right"|-
|- bgcolor="white"
!align="left" colspan=3|Total
!align="right"|213,372
!align="right"|100.00%
!align="right"|

See also
Electoral district (Canada)
List of Saskatchewan provincial electoral districts
List of Saskatchewan general elections
List of political parties in Saskatchewan

References
 Saskatchewan Archives Board – Saskatchewan Election Results By Electoral Division

Saskatoon
Former provincial electoral districts of Saskatchewan
1908 establishments in Saskatchewan
1967 disestablishments in Saskatchewan